is a village located in Fukushima Prefecture, Japan. , the village had an estimated population of 5,935 in 2016 households, and a population density of 66 persons per km².

Geography
Hirata is located in southeast Fukushima prefecture, approximately halfway between the cities of Iwaki and Kōriyama. The landscape consists of rolling hills with an altitude of between 500 and 700 meters.

Rivers: Abukuma River

Neighboring municipalities
 Fukushima Prefecture
 Iwaki
 Kōriyama
 Sukagawa
 Tamakawa
 Ishikawa
 Furudono 
 Ono

Demographics
Per Japanese census data, the population of Hirata peaked at around the year 1950 and has been gradually declining since.

Climate
Hirata has a humid climate (Köppen climate classification Cfa).

History
The area of present-day Hirata was part of ancient Mutsu Province. During the Edo period it was mostly the territory of Tsuchiura Domain. After the Meiji Restoration, it was organized as part of Ishikawa District within the Nakadōri region of Iwaki Province. The villages of Odaira and Yomogida were created on April 1, 1889 with the establishment of the modern municipalities system. The two villages merged on March 31, 1955 to form the village of Hirata.

Economy
The economy of Hirata is primarily based on agriculture.

Education
Hiram has two public elementary schools and one public junior high school operated by the village government, and one public high school operated by the Fukushima Prefectural Department of Education.
Fukushima Prefectural Ono Higher Hirata High School
Hirata Yomogida High School
Hirata Odaira Middle School
Hirata Yomogida School
Hirata Odaira Elementary School

Transportation

Railway
 Hirata does not have any passenger train service.

Highway

Local attractions
Site of Yomogida Castle
Shibazakura Matsuri
Komagata Jangara Nembutsu Folk Dance

References

External links

 

 
Villages in Fukushima Prefecture